Cedres (French for cedars) may refer to:

People
Antonio Cedrés (1927–2015), Spanish footballer and coach
Cristian Cedrés (born 1996), Spanish footballer
Fernando Clavijo Cedrés (1956–2019), Uruguayan-born American soccer player and head coach
Gabriel Cedrés (born 1970), Uruguayan footballer
Jimena Cedrés (born 1993), Argentine field hockey player
Juan Cedrés (1927–1979), Spanish professional footballer
Miguel Jiménez (boxer) (born 1970), Cedres, Puerto Rican retired boxer

Places
Les Cèdres, Quebec, municipality in the Montérégie of Quebec, Canada
Montréal/Les Cèdres Airport, general aviation aerodrome near Montreal, Quebec, Canada
Jardin botanique "Les Cèdres", often called simply Les Cèdres, a private botanical garden in Saint-Jean-Cap-Ferrat, Provence-Alpes-Côte d'Azur, France

See also
Cedre, a French car manufacturer